The 2014 Limerick Premier Intermediate Hurling Championship was the inaugural staging of the Limerick Premier Intermediate Hurling Championship since its establishment by the Limerick County Board. The championship began on 18 April 2014 and ended on 25 October 2014.

On 25 October 2014, Bruff won the championship after a 2-14 to 0-16 defeat of Croom in the final at FitzGerald Park, Kilmallock. It was their first ever championship title in this grade.

Results

Final

References

External links

 Limerick GAA website

Limerick Premier Intermediate Hurling Championship
Limerick Premier Intermediate Hurling Championship